

Sponsorship

Club

Coaching staff
{|class="wikitable"
|-
!Position
!Staff
|-
|General Manager|| Aung Tun Oo
|-
|rowspan="1"|Head coach|| Desaeyere Rene Oscar
|-
|Assistant coach|| U Zaw Lay Aung
|-
|Assistant coach|| Aung Kyaw Moe
|-

Other information

|-

League table
Below is the league table for 2017 season.

2017 AFC Cup

2017 Players squad

References

External links
 First Eleven Journal in Burmese
 Soccer Myanmar in Burmese

Myanmar National League